Owzun Qui or Uzun Qui may refer to:
 Owzun Qui 1
 Owzun Qui 2